Ruth Gavison (March 28, 1945, Jerusalem – August 15, 2020, Jerusalem) was an Israeli expert of human rights, professor of law at the Hebrew University of Jerusalem, and recipient of the Israel Prize.

Biography
Ruth Gavison was born in Jerusalem on March 28, 1945 to a Sephardic Jewish family. Her father's ancestors were Moroccan Jews who immigrated from Tetouan to Jerusalem in the 19th century. Her mother's side was Greek Jewish. She grew up in Haifa. She graduated from Hebrew University law school in 1969. In 1970, she was also awarded a B.A. in Philosophy and Economics.

Further academic degrees and qualifications:
 LL.M., 1971, Hebrew University, Jerusalem.
 D.Phil. (Oxon.) (legal philosophy), 1975, University of Oxford.
 Clerk to Justice B. Halevi, Israel Supreme Court, 1970.
 Admitted to the Israeli Bar, 1971.

Academic career
Her areas of research included Ethnic Conflict, the Protection of Minorities, Human Rights, Political Theory, Judiciary Law, Religion and Politics, and Israel as a Jewish and democratic state. She was a member of the Israel Academy of Sciences and Humanities.

Judicial career
Gavison was nominated for a position on Israel's Supreme Court in 2005 but failed to secure a majority for the appointment. Justice Minister Daniel Friedmann reportedly asserted in 2007 that existing Supreme Court justices opposed her nomination because of their disagreement with her views.

Published works
She published an essay on privacy in the Yale Law Journal and edited a volume dedicated to H.L.A. Hart's legal philosophy published by Oxford. Recently, she published an essay about days of rest in divided societies (co-authored with Nahshon Perez), included in Law and Religion in Comparative Context, published by Cambridge. She was a member of the editorial board of the Jewish Review of Books.

With Rabbi Yaaqov Medan, she coauthored the Gavison-Medan Covenant, a proposal for the coexistence of religious and secular Israelis.

Civil rights activism
Gavison was a founding member of the Association for Civil Rights in Israel (ACRI), where she served for many years as Chairperson and as President from 1996 to 1999. Professor Gavison was a member of the International Commission of Jurists from 1998 to 2008. In 2005 she founded Metzilah (Center of Zionist, Jewish, Liberal, and Humanistic Thought) and served as its chair and founding president.

Academic appointments
 1969–2020: various appointments at the Faculty of Law of the Hebrew University, Jerusalem (HUJI).
 1978–1980: Visiting Associate Professor of Law, Yale Law School.
 1984–2010: Haim H. Cohn Chair for Human Rights, HUJI.
 1990–2010: Full Professor, Faculty of Law, HUJI.
 1990–1992: Visiting Professor of Law, University of Southern California.
 1998–1999: Fellow, Center for Human Values, Princeton University.
 2010–2020: Professor Emerita, HUJI.
 2011–2012: Fellow, Strauss center for Law and Justice, NYU Law School.

Public committees
Gavison was a member of numerous Israeli Public Inquiry committees, including the following:
 1976: Member, Kahan Committee on Privacy (generated Israel's law of privacy 1981).
 1983: Member, committee on the privacy of information in governmental data-banks (generated an amendment to the privacy law).
 1987–1990: Member, a public committee on orthodox-secular relationships in Israel.
 1994–1997: Member, National Committee for Scientific and Technological Infrastructure.
 1996–1997: Member, Zadok committee on press laws.
 1997–1998: Member, Shamgar Committee on the Appointment of the Attorney-General and Related Issues.
 2006–2008: Member, Winograd Commission to investigate the 2006 Lebanon War.
 2013–2015: commissioned by the minister of Justice to report on the constitutional anchoring of Israel as a Jewish and democratic state.

Awards and recognition
 In 1997, Gavison was awarded the Zeltner Prize for legal research.
 In 1998, she received the Bar Association Prize, together with Association for Civil Rights in Israel.
 In 2001, she received the Avi Chai Prize, together with Rabbi Yaakov Medan, for bringing together Israeli society.
 In 2002, she was awarded the Jerusalem Prize for tolerance.
 In 2003, she was awarded the EMET Prize.
 In 2003, she was granted an honorary doctorate by the Jewish Theological Seminary, New York.
 In 2009, she was awarded the Cheshin Prize for excellence in research by the Hebrew University of Jerusalem.
 In 2009, she was granted an honorary doctorate by the Bar-Ilan University.
 In 2011, she was awarded the Israel Prize, for legal research.
 In 2013, she received the Solomon Bublick Award of the Hebrew University of Jerusalem.
 In 2015, she was awarded an honorary degree by the Open University in  Israel.

See also 
List of Israel Prize recipients

References

External links
  Mika Levy, Biography of Ruth Gavison, Jewish Women's Archive
  Resume of Ruth Gavison (in Hebrew), Israel Prize website 
  Website of Ruth Gavison
  Debating Israel's Identity - Fathom Journal

1945 births
2020 deaths
Israeli Sephardi Jews
People from Jerusalem
Israeli jurists
Hebrew University of Jerusalem Faculty of Law alumni
Academic staff of the Hebrew University of Jerusalem
Israel Prize in law recipients
Israel Prize women recipients
EMET Prize recipients in the Social Sciences
Solomon Bublick Award recipients
Israeli people of Moroccan-Jewish descent
Israeli people of Greek-Jewish descent
20th-century Sephardi Jews
21st-century Sephardi Jews
Jewish women
Israeli women lawyers
Mizrahi Jews